"Plateau" is a song by alternative rock band the Meat Puppets, written by vocalist and guitarist, Curt Kirkwood. It appears on the band's second album, Meat Puppets II, released by SST Records in April 1984.

The song was popularized when Curt and his brother, vocalist and bassist Cris Kirkwood, performed it with American rock band Nirvana at their MTV Unplugged appearance at Sony Music Studios in New York City on November 18, 1993.

Reception

The song was included in The Pitchfork 500, a book published by online music publication Pitchfork in 2008, featuring their list of the "greatest songs" from 1977 to 2006.

Nirvana version

"Plateau" was one of three songs from  Meat Puppets II, along with "Oh, Me," and "Lake of Fire," covered by Nirvana at their MTV Unplugged concert. 

"Plateau" and "Lake of "Fire" were included in the original broadcast of the show, and all three songs were released on the live album, MTV Unplugged in New York, in November 1994. The full show, featuring all three Meat Puppets covers, was released on DVD in 2007. The DVD also featured footage of the Kirkwood brothers rehearsing "Plateau" with Nirvana prior to the show.

Legacy

The title of the June 2006 debut album by English rapper  Plan B,  Who Needs Actions When You Got Words, was taken from a lyric from the song. The Nirvana version was sampled on his 2007 mixtape, Paint It Blacker: The Bootleg Album.

References 

Meat Puppets songs
Nirvana (band) songs
1983 songs
Songs written by Curt Kirkwood